Paḷḷuezu (also known as Patsuezu, Pachuezu, Patsuezo, Pachuezo, or Nuesa Ḷḷingua ("our language")) is a dialect of Asturian-Leonese, which is one of the Iberian Romance languages. It is one of eight recognized dialects of the Leonese language in the narrow sense of the designation "Leonese" (i.e., excluding Asturian, Cantabrian, Eonavian, and Mirandese).

Paḷḷuezu is spoken in the upper half of the valley of the Sil River, in the comarca of El Bierzo, which is in the northwest of the Province of León, and to a minor extent in the province of Asturias, in the lands north of this portion of the Sil valley. The majority of Paḷḷuezu speakers reside in the municipality of Laciana. Paḷḷuezu is also spoken upriver from Laciana in the municipality of Babia, downriver from Laciana in the municipalities of Palacios del Sil and Páramo del Sil, and elsewhere.

Palacios del Sil and Páramo del Sil are part of an ancient district called Ribas de Sil, and this name is still in use. (The toponym Ribas de Sil occurs also in Galician speaking territory to the west, in the neighboring Province of Lugo.) The number of speakers of this dialect is unknown. However, the combined population of all speakers of Asturian-Leonese in the provinces of León and Zamora is only 20,000 to 25,000.

Orthography

The Asturian spelling Ḷḷ ḷḷ, called "che vaqueira" is used where l.l has sometimes been used if it is impossible to write ḷḷ. It can be a voiceless retroflex affricate [tʂ], a voiced retroflex plosive [ɖ] or a voiced retroflex affricate [dʐ], and it corresponds to standard palatal lateral approximant /ʎ/, dritten Ll ll and called "elle". The latter spelling is current in publications of the Paḷḷuezu literary revival that has been underway since approximately 2006.

Main consonantal features 

The main consonantal features distinguishing this dialect from Spanish (many of which are common to Astur-Leonese generally) are:

 It preserves the  phoneme [ʃ] (voiceless palatal fricative), spelled 'x'.
 Latin /-li-/ becomes the voiceless palatal affricate [tʃ], spelled ch.
 Latin /pl-,cl-,fl-/ become [tʃ].
 Latin /-mb-/ is preserved.
 Latin /f-/ is preserved.
 Latin initial /l-/ palatalizes into the apico-postalveolar voiceless affricate spelled ḷḷ (termed "che vaqueira" in Spain, "cowherd ch" used by the transhumant herders of the region, who form a distinct society) which used to be spelled ts. This is distinct from the Pal.luezu palatal affricate ch.

Grammatical features
 Possessive adjectives are always preceded by the definite article: la mia fuecha 'my leaf' (Spanish mi hoja). (This is usually the case in Catalan and Italian too.)

Literary revival

In 2006, an anthology was published, Cuentos del Sil [Tales of the Sil] (Severiano Alvarez and eight other authors), Na Nuesa Ḷḷingua. . For the year 2009, the Asociación Club Xeitu de la Montaña Occidental Astur-Leonesa (founded 2009) started an annual literary competition, the Certamen Lliterariu "Guzmán Álvarez". The competition continued in 2010 and 2011.

Notes

References
 Diario de León. 17 April 2011. "El alto Sil, negro sobre blanco". Report on the publication of García Jiménez 2010.
 García Gil, Hector. 2010. Asturian-Leonese: linguistic, sociolinguistic, and legal aspects. Mercator legislation. Working Paper 25. Barcelona: CIEMEN.
 
 González-Quevedo, Roberto. 2003. El Pachuezu, la nuesa l.lingua (snippet view). Villablino: Asociación de Amigos de Sierra-Pambley.

Further reading
 García Jiménez, Rita. 2010. Del ralbar al filandón. Vida y costumbres en Ribas del Sil. Club Xeitu. Includes a glossary of terms from Palacios del Sil.

External links
 Asociación Club Xeitu de la Montaña Occidental Astur-Leonesa

Leonese language
Endangered Romance languages